Shan-e-Ramazan is a Pakistani live television special transmission show of ARY Digital. The transmission includes the recitation of the Quran, Naat Sharif and discussion of various topics and highlighting the teachings of Islam and also includes some relevant competitions like quiz and debate competitions. It is hosted by Pakistani news anchor and host Waseem Badami on ARY Digital.

History

ARY Digital 
Shan-e-Ramazan first started on 8 July 2013 on ARY Digital. It was hosted by Waseem Badami along with Junaid Jamshed as a co-host. It debuted with the Shan-e-Sehr segment and ended on 7 August 2013. Its first kalaam featured Faysal Qureshi along with Badami in a special appearance. In 2014, Shan-e-Ramazan returned and aired from 28 June 2014 to 27 July 2014 with Badami and Junaid Jamshed as co-hosts. The 2014 Shan-e-Ramazan kalaam features Tasleem Ahmed Sabri and sung by Amjad Sabri.

The 2015 edition of Shan-e-Ramazan aired from 17 June 2015 to 17 July 2015. It was co-hosted as a guest host by Junaid Jamshed. The official soundtrack of season 3 features Sanam Baloch, Hina Dilpazeer, Tasleem Ahmed Sabri, Iqrar ul Hassan and sung by Amjad Sabri.

The fourth season aired from 6 June 2016 to 5 July 2016. It was hosted by Waseem Badami while Junaid Jamshed returned as a guest host. The official soundtrack features Anwar Maqsood, Ayaz Samoo and Nida Yasir.

The fifth season aired from 27 May 2017 to 26 June 2017. It was hosted by Iqrar ul Hassan, Waseem Badami and Shahid Afridi. Its official soundtrack features Badami, Afridi along-with Humayun Saeed, Faysal Qureshi and Nida Yasir.

In 2018, Iqrar ul Hassan was introduced to Shan-e-Ramazan. He used to appear in Shan-e-Ramazan Iftari related segments.

Its eighth season aired on ARY Digital from 26 April 2020 to 26 May 2020. Its ninth season aired from 14 April 2021 to 12 May 2021. Its tenth season started airing from 3 April 2022.

Soundtracks

ARY Digital

See also 

 List of Pakistani television serials
 List of Pakistani television stations
 List of programs broadcast by ARY Digital

References

External links 
Shan e Ramazan - Archives on ARY Digital website

2013 Pakistani television series debuts
ARY Digital original programming
Television shows set in Karachi
Urdu-language television shows
Ramadan special television shows